David Kollar (born 25 October 1983) is a Slovak experimental guitarist and composer. He was born in Prešov into a musical family. He began his career at the end of the nineties in various amateur groups. He studied with guitarist Andrej Šeban. His first album called Free Your Minds was released in 2005. He is also film and stage music composer. In 2014 he did a tour with American drummer Pat Mastelotto and Italian trumpeter Paolo Raineri. Kollar appears on the 2017 Steven Wilson album To the Bone, playing on two tracks, "Song of I" and "Detonation".

References

1983 births
Living people
Slovak guitarists
Experimental guitarists
Musicians from Prešov
21st-century guitarists